Orthosiphon ferrugineus is a species of flowering plant in the family Lamiaceae. It is found only on Socotra Island, part of the nation of Yemen. Its natural habitat is subtropical or tropical dry shrubland. It belongs under the class of Magnoliopsida.

References

ferrugineus
Endemic flora of Socotra
Vulnerable plants
Plants described in 1883
Taxonomy articles created by Polbot
Taxa named by Isaac Bayley Balfour